30 Éxitos Insuperables (Spanish for: "30 Unbeatable Hits") refers to multiple compilation albums released from 2003 to 2004 by EMI, including:

 30 Éxitos Insuperables (Luis Miguel album)
 30 Éxitos Insuperables (Mijares album)
 30 Éxitos Insuperables, by Los Alegres de Terán
 30 Éxitos Insuperables, by Álvaro Torres
 30 Éxitos Insuperables, by Los Ángeles Negros
 30 Éxitos Insuperables, by Los Barón de Apodaca
 30 Éxitos Insuperables, by Bobby Pulido
 30 Éxitos Insuperables, by Daniela Romo
 30 Éxitos Insuperables, by Los Donneños
 30 Éxitos Insuperables, by Dyango
 30 Éxitos Insuperables, by Eddie Santiago
 30 Éxitos Insuperables, by Ednita Nazario
 30 Éxitos Insuperables, by Emilio Navaira
 30 Éxitos Insuperables, by Graciela Beltrán
 30 Éxitos Insuperables, by Jailene Cintrón
 30 Éxitos Insuperables, by Jon Secada
 30 Éxitos Insuperables, by José Luis Perales
 30 Éxitos Insuperables, by Laura Canales
 30 Éxitos Insuperables, by Lorenzo de Monteclaro
 30 Éxitos Insuperables, by Lucho Gatica
 30 Éxitos Insuperables, by La Mafia
 30 Éxitos Insuperables, by Mazz
 30 Éxitos Insuperables, by Miguel Gallardo (singer)
 30 Éxitos Insuperables, by Los Mismos
 30 Éxitos Insuperables, by Nelson Ned
 30 Éxitos Insuperables, by Paloma San Basilio
 30 Éxitos Insuperables, by Pandora (musical group)
 30 Éxitos Insuperables, by Paulina Rubio
 30 Éxitos Insuperables, by Ram Herrera
 30 Éxitos Insuperables, by Raphael (singer)
 30 Éxitos Insuperables, by Salvatore Adamo
 30 Éxitos Insuperables, by La Tropa F
 30 Éxitos Insuperables, by Yuri (Mexican singer)